Industry may refer to:

Economics
 Industry (economics), a generally categorized branch of economic activity
 Industry (manufacturing), a specific branch of economic activity, typically in factories with machinery
 The wider industrial sector of an economy, including manufacturing and production of other intermediate or final goods
 The general characteristics and production methods common to an industrial society
 Industrialization, the transformation into an industrial society
 Industry classification, a classification of economic organizations and activities

Places
Industry, Alabama
Industry, California
 Industry station
Industry, Illinois
Industry, Kansas
Industry, Maine
Industry, Missouri
Industry, New York
Industry, Pennsylvania
Industry, Texas
Industry Bar, a New York City gay bar
Industry-Rock Falls Township, Phelps County, Nebraska

Film and television
 Made in Canada (TV series), a Canadian situation comedy series also known as The Industry in foreign syndication
 Industry (TV series), a British drama series on BBC Two and HBO

Music
 Industry (American band), a 1980s synth-pop band
 Industry (Irish band), Irish band (2009–2010)
 Industry (Dom & Roland album)
 Industry (Richard Thompson and Danny Thompson album), 1997
 Industry (EP), an EP by Jon McLaughlin

Other
 Industry (archaeology), a typological classification of stone tools

See also
Industrial (disambiguation)
Industria (disambiguation)